Caribou High School is a public high school educating students in grades 9 through 12.  It is located in Caribou, Maine, at 308 Sweden Street in the United States.

Recognized by Redbook’s National Best Schools Programs for their Automated Library System,  Caribou High School offers many outstanding programs.

The school is home of the Caribou Future Farmers of America, which is the oldest FFA chapter in the State of Maine, and one of the school's first clubs.

The school's athletic teams, the Vikings,  offer for girls and boys : basketball (Boys 2019 State Champions, Class B), baseball, softball, soccer (Girls 2010 Eastern Maine Champions, Class B, Boys 2019 Northern Maine Champions Class B), volleyball, track and field, cross country running (Boys 2010 State Champions, class B), Alpine (downhill) skiing, Nordic (cross country) skiing (Boys 2011 State Champions and Girls 2010 State Champions, Class B), wrestling, and cheering.

Notable people
 Samuel Collins, Jr., judge and politician
 Susan Collins, United States senator
 Gregory Johnson, Navy admiral

Notable staff 

 John Lisnik, politician and former teacher
 Kevin St. Jarre, author, soldier, and former teacher

Notes

External links
 Official website

Public high schools in Maine
Schools in Aroostook County, Maine
Caribou, Maine